Café Rica is a Costa Rican coffee-flavored liqueur. It is thick and sweet with a strong coffee flavor from which it gets its namesake. It is made from coffee harvested in Costa Rica.

History
Café Rica was created by a Jamaican businessman named Edward Drew in 1978 as the first product of Costa Rican company Salicsa.

Uses
Café Rica can be used in much the same way as any other coffee liqueur such as Kahlúa, though recipes may need to be slightly adjusted as Café Rica contains 10% more abv than Kahlúa.

See also

List of cocktails
List of coffee liqueurs

References

External links
 Salicsa website

Coffee liqueurs
Costa Rican brands
Products introduced in 1978